Cat's paw coral may refer to several different species of coral:

 species of the genus Psammocora
 species of the genus Stylophora (coral)

Set index articles on corals